Annamycin is an anthracycline antibiotic being investigated for the treatment of cancer.

Further reading

External links 
 National Cancer Institute Definition of Annamycin

Anthracyclines